There are over 700 choirs in Estonia, a country of only 1.4 million people. The following is a list of some of the notable choirs.

College choirs
Chamber Choir of Tallinn Technical University (Tallinna Tehnikaülikooli Kammerkoor) - conductor: Ilmars Millers
Tallinn Music High School Chamber Choir (Tallinna Muusikakeskkooli Kammerkoor)  - conductor: Evi Eespere
Academic Male Choir of Tallinn Technical University (Tehnikalikooli Akadeemilise Meeskoori) - conductor: Peeter Perens
Tallinn University Academic Male Choir (Tallinna Ülikooli Akadeemiline Meeskoor) - conductors: Jüri Rent and Indrek Vijard
Tartu Academic Male Choir (Tartu Akadeemilne Meeskoor)
Mixed Choir of Tartu Teacher Training College (Tartu Õpetajate Seminari Segakoor)
Tartu University Women's Choir (Tartu Ülikooli Akadeemiline Naiskoor) - conductor: Triin Koch

Church choirs
St. Charles Church Concert and Chamber Choir (Tallinn Kaarli Kiriku Koork) - conductor: Heli Jürgenson

Male choirs
Estonian National Male Choir - conductor: Mikk Üleoja
Estonian United Boys Choir and Revalia Male Chamber Choir - conductor: Hirvo Surva
Tallinn Boys Choir (Tallinna Poistekoor) - conductor: Lydia Rahula
Tartu Boys Choir (Tartu Poistekoor)

Women's choirs
Tartu University Female Choir - conductor: Triin Koch
Estonian TV Girls' Choir and Children's Choir - conductor: Aarne Saluveer
Estonian Academy of Music Female Choir - conductor: Ene Kangrun
Ellerhein Girls' Choir - conductor: Tiia Loitme
EKN - Estonian Choral Conductors' Female Choir - conductor: Ants Sööt
Estonian National Girls' Choir LEELO - conductor: Külli Kiivet

See also
Estonian Song Festival